Çayağzı is a village in the Bingöl District, Bingöl Province, Turkey. The village had a population of 187 in 2021.

The hamlet of Aşağı Ardıçtepe is attached to the village.

References 

Villages in Bingöl District
Kurdish settlements in Bingöl Province